Duchess Helene of Mecklenburg-Schwerin (Helene Luise Elisabeth; 24 January 1814 – 17 May 1858) was a French Crown Princess after her marriage in 1837 to the eldest son of Louis Philippe I. She is known as the mother of the future Count of Paris and Duke of Chartres.

Her descendants include present-day pretenders to the throne of France, Romania and Italy, and the kings of Spain and Belgium.

Biography

Early life and family
Born at the Schloss Ludwigslust, the retreat from the capital of her native Mecklenburg-Schwerin, she was the only daughter born to the Hereditary Grand Duke of Mecklenburg-Schwerin and his second wife Princess Karoline Luise of Saxe-Weimar-Eisenach, third daughter of Grand Duke Carl August and Princess Louisa of Hessen-Darmstadt. Via her father she was granddaughter of Frederick Francis I, Grand Duke of Mecklenburg-Schwerin and his wife Princess Louise of Saxe-Gotha-Altenburg. She was also indirectly related to Frederick William III of Prussia (first cousin once removed, also her half-brother married Frederick William III's daughter). On her paternal side she was a cousin of the Duchess of Kent as well as Leopold I of Belgium. Maternal cousins included the then Queen of Prussia as well as the King of Württemberg.

Her father was the eldest son and heir of Frederick Francis I, Grand Duke of Mecklenburg. Her mother was a princess of Duchy of Saxe-Weimar-Eisenach. The Hereditary Grand Duke and his wife died within three years of each other. Helene's mother died in January 1816 and her father then died in 1819, leaving her older half brother Paul Frederick of Mecklenburg-Schwerin, the new Hereditary Grand Duke, and her other siblings to be raised by her grandfather, the reigning Grand Duke.

Marriage
On 30 May 1837 Helene Luise married Ferdinand Philippe d'Orléans at the Palace of Fontainebleau. The Archbishop of Paris Hyacinthe-Louis de Quélen had used the pretext of religious differences to forbid it taking place in Notre Dame de Paris. She was chosen as the bride for the Duke to form an alliance with her cousin Frederick William III of Prussia, despite the fact that she was a Protestant and that she was considered to be a liberal, and not considered a beauty: described as an ambitious person, she accepted the proposal against the will of her family because she wanted to become a queen.

Her husband was the eldest son of king Louis Philippe I and his Italian consort, Queen Maria Amalia. For the Duke of Orléans, it was a convenient alliance but one without much attraction – Metternich remarked that she was "Petite but of a good house".

The marriage was described as happy, and it was mostly the Queen who opposed her as a Protestant and a liberal. She became popular with the public by her introduction of the German Christmas tree in France. The couple had two children in quick succession. Their eldest Philippe, born at the Palais des Tuileries in Paris, would later be hailed as Louis Philippe II by Royalists. Their other son Robert fought for the Union in the American Civil War, and then for France in the 1870 Franco-Prussian War.

On 13 July 1842, her husband died from injuries sustained after jumping from an out of control carriage. His untimely death sparked a debate within the House of Orléans over the establishment of a regency council which would be necessary should Louis Philippe I die while his heir was still in infancy. The main contenders were Ferdinand Philippe's widow and his brother Louis, Duke of Nemours, but further developments meant that the regency did not in the end materialise. In 1848, her father-in-law was deposed. Helene planned to prevent the abolition of the monarchy and be proclaimed as regent for her young son. Louis, Duke of Nemours, resigned his right to act as regent for her son to Helene and Helene appeared at the French parliament with her two sons; the Count of Paris and her younger son the Duke of Chartres, to claim her son's right to the throne and to be installed as his regent during his minority. This claim, however, was not accepted by the parliament. After failing to seize power, she left France for Germany with her children. Helene continued to actively claim the rights of her son to be the monarch of France from abroad, but the French royalists at home began to favour the other formerly reigning French royal line under the headship of the Count of Chambord instead.

Death 
Helene died of a flu in Richmond; she passed the illness onto her son Robert who was staying with her at the time but he survived and continued to fight in the Wars of Italian Unification.

She was initially buried at Weybridge before being translated to the Chapelle royale de Dreux in Dreux in 1876.

Children

Ancestors

References and notes

Bibliography 
  Généalogie des rois et des princes, by Jean-Charles Volkmann. Edit: Jean-Paul Gisserot (1998)
  Les Orléans, une famille en guête d’un trône Les Orléans, by Georges Poisson Perrin (1999)
  Hélène de Mecklembourg-Schwerin; Madame la duchesse d'Orléans; new edition. Paris: Michel Lévy (1859)

External links 

 Meyers Konversationslexikon

1814 births
1858 deaths
House of Mecklenburg-Schwerin
Duchesses of Orléans
Princesses of France (Orléans)
19th-century German people
People from Ludwigslust
Duchesses of Mecklenburg-Schwerin
Burials at the Chapelle royale de Dreux
Royal reburials